Margarita Pasos (born 20 October 1965) is a Mexican sailor. She competed in the women's 470 event at the 1992 Summer Olympics.

References

External links
 

1965 births
Living people
Mexican female sailors (sport)
Olympic sailors of Mexico
Sailors at the 1992 Summer Olympics – 470
Place of birth missing (living people)